Dynomite may refer to:

"Dynomite" (song), by Bazuka, 1975
Dynomite! (video game), a 2002 game for PC
"Dynomite!", a catchphrase used by J. J. Evans in the American TV series Good Times

See also
Dynamite (disambiguation)